Lanhe may refer to:

 Lanhe, Guangzhou (榄核镇), town in Panyu District, Guangzhou, Guangdong, China
 Lanhe, Nanxiong (澜河镇), town in Guangdong, China